Mark Holden (born Mark Adrian Cortis; 21 September 1962; legal name Mark Adrian Holden-Aikhomu) is a British-born Canadian actor of Nigerian descent, who works in film, television, theatre and voice. He has worked extensively throughout Canada, UK, Europe and South Africa. He is best known for playing CIA handler John Lynn in the Fox Networks Group television series Deep State and playing James Morse on stage in the original London cast of Pretty Woman: The Musical at the Savoy Theatre in the West End. Most recently his voice can be heard playing Doctor Paradox in the 2020 video game Cyberpunk 2077, developed by CD Projekt, and playing Nikolas in another eagerly awaited video game Dying Light 2: Stay Human developed by Techland.

Early life
Holden was born in Plymouth, Devon, England on 21 September 1962, the son of the late Admiral Augustus Akhabue Aikhomu, former Vice President of the Federal Republic of Nigeria from 1986 to 1993 and the late Shirley Anne Holden (née. Cortis). He attended Burrington Secondary Modern School in Manadon from 1974 to 1979. His mother planted the acting bug, by frequently taking him to live theatre performances and movies at the local cinemas. At approximately 10 or 11 years of age, he began to tread the boards at a local amateur theatre company. He also started competing in sprint events and the high jump at the City of Plymouth Athletics Club, which was based at the Brickfields Recreation Grounds in Devonport, Plymouth.

Career
In his late 20s, he began his acting career, and was cast as Villac Umu in 1992 in The Royal Hunt of the Sun by the late Robin Phillips, Director General at the Citadel Theatre in Edmonton, Alberta, Canada. He was cast in a further six productions over the next three years at the Citadel Theatre, La Bête, Wait Until Dark, Oliver!, Macbeth, Caesar and Cleopatra and The Cherry Orchard.

His film credits include World War Z, Bang Bang You're Dead, The Infiltrator, Stalled and Final Destination. He played William Rios in the 2013 biographical drama-thriller film Captain Phillips, starring Tom Hanks, Barkhad Abdi and Catherine Keener. 

His television credits include Riviera, Stargate SG-1, 24: Live Another Day, Doctors, The X-Files, Casualty, Andromeda, Millennium and MythQuest.

From 2018 to 2019, he played the role of CIA handler John Lynn in the Fox Networks Group television drama series Deep State.

In 2014, Holden wrote and produced his own international award-winning short film, called The Double Deal, in which he also starred as the lead character, Matthew Calder, alongside Captain Phillips castmates Vincenzo Nicoli and David Webber. It can be viewed on YouTube.

Prior to Holden becoming an actor, he was a police officer in two different countries. He served in the Metropolitan Police Service, London, United Kingdom from 1981 to 1987, and the Edmonton Police Service, Alberta, Canada from 1987 to 1996. Whilst Holden served as a police officer he was also an international bobsledder in two man and four man bob, and competed on the Great Britain Bobsleigh Team (1985-1987) on the World Cup Circuit, European Bobsleigh Championships 1986 in Igls, Innsbruck, Austria and achieved 16th place in GB3 in the 1986 World Bobsleigh Championships FIBT World Championships 1986 in Koenigsee, West Germany in the two man bob as the brakeman behind driver Peter Brugnani. Holden also competed on the Canadian Bobsleigh Team  (1990-1991 season) on the World Cup Circuit. 

Holden continued policing whilst he gained experience taking acting classes, and performing in productions and eventually gaining his Canadian Equity card at the Citadel Theatre, Edmonton, before moving to the West Coast of Canada to work in the film and television industry in Vancouver, British Columbia. He subsidised his income working as a licensed private investigator.

Personal life
Holden emigrated to Canada in 1987, where he  now has two daughters from a previous marriage, and five grandchildren. In 2003 he returned back to the United Kingdom to further his acting career. After meeting Patsy McKay in 2005 he decided to stay in the UK. They were married 3 years later and have twin boys, and currently reside in London. 

In 2004, Holden climbed Mount Kilimanjaro for the charity Voluntary Services Overseas. He succeeded in reaching the summit Uhuru Peak at mid morning, after leaving Kibo Huts Camp Site around midnight. His many hikes over the years in the Canadian Rockies and West Coast Mountains prepared him for this amazing adventure. 

In 2009, Holden hiked the Inca Trail to Machu Picchu with his wife Patsy for the charity World Vision. One of the highlights is waiting in the early morning at the Sun Gate for the mist to clear across the valley to reveal the ancient ruins of the city of Machu Picchu.

Filmography

Film (selected)

Television (selected)

Theatre (selected)

Video Games (selected)

Awards

References

External links
 

 Mark Holden

1962 births
Living people
Black Canadian male actors
Canadian expatriates in the United Kingdom
Canadian male film actors
Canadian male television actors
Canadian male video game actors
Canadian male voice actors
Canadian people of Nigerian descent
Male actors from Plymouth, Devon
20th-century Canadian male actors
21st-century Canadian male actors